Biało-czarna is the first album by Polish thrash metal band Kat & Roman Kostrzewski. It was released on 11 April 2011,  by the label Mystic Production.

The album's name is a wordplay on the term "Biało-czerwona" (White-and-red), which is used to refer to the Polish flag or anything representing Poland in general, i.e. the national football team or the army. Black replaces Red, as the black color is used to represent the Catholic church and its priests in black cassocks. The album cover features the Polish flag in greyscale, with a cross over the white eagle, symbolizing "parasitic" influence of the Church over the country together with the title. The lyrics as well revolve around common critiques of the Polish Catholic Church, and the Catholic Church in general, including child molestation, criminal impunity and corruption.

Track listing

Personnel

Charts

References

2011 debut albums
Kat & Roman Kostrzewski albums
Mystic Production albums
Polish-language albums